Ružići may refer to:

 Ružići (Grude), a village near Grude, Bosnia and Herzegovina
 Ružići, Primorje-Gorski Kotar County, a village near Matulji, Croatia
 Ružići, Poreč, a settlement near Poreč, Istria County, Croatia
 Ružići, Sveta Nedelja, a village near Sveta Nedelja, Istria County, Croatia

See also
 Ružić (singular form)